Soul is Heavy is the fourth album by singer Nneka. It was released on 18 March 2012 in the U.K. In a recent interview, Nneka stated that the album is "a bit more of a “band” sound this time around, a mix of digital and organic music. Still very me, though. It deals with issues that have to do with the day-to-day life of people: corruption, false prophecies, religion, war conflict…"

Track listing

Charts

References 

2012 albums
Nneka (singer) albums
Igbo-language albums
Decon albums